Adam Creighton (born June 2, 1965) is a Canadian former professional ice hockey player who played 708 career National Hockey League games after winning the Memorial Cup in 1984 as a member of the Ottawa 67's.

Career
He played professionally for the Buffalo Sabres, Chicago Blackhawks, New York Islanders, Tampa Bay Lightning and St. Louis Blues.

Now retired as a player, Creighton serves as a scout for the Boston Bruins organization. His father Dave was also a former NHL player.

Career statistics

Regular season and playoffs

International

References

External links

1965 births
Living people
Augsburger Panther players
Boston Bruins scouts
Buffalo Sabres draft picks
Buffalo Sabres players
Chicago Blackhawks players
Guelph Platers players
Ice hockey people from Ontario
National Hockey League first-round draft picks
New York Islanders players
Ottawa 67's players
Sportspeople from Burlington, Ontario
St. Louis Blues players
Tampa Bay Lightning players
Canadian ice hockey centres